The Minister for Forestry is a position in the Cabinet of Western Australia. The minister is responsible for the Forest Products Commission, an agency of the government of Western Australia, and may hold other portfolios in addition to forestry. The current Minister for Forestry is Dave Kelly of the Labor Party, who holds the position as a member of the McGowan Labor Government.

The responsibilities now incorporated in the portfolio were originally held by the Colonial Secretary, and subsequently the Minister for Lands. A separate Minister for Forests was not appointed until the 1917 Lefroy Ministry, with the inaugural minister being Robert Robinson. From the late 1950s to the early 1980s the forests and lands portfolios were generally held by the same person, and for a brief period during the Court Ministry the two portfolios were merged, under the title Minister for Lands and Forests. The portfolio was again merged with others during the late 1980s and 1990s, with the minister responsible for forestry known as the Minister for Conservation and Land Management from 1985 to 1993 and as the Minister for Primary Industries from 1993 to 2001. Although the portfolio has since then often been held by the Minister for Agriculture or the Minister for Fisheries, it has been once again a standalone portfolio since 2006.

List of Ministers for Forestry
Eighteen people have been appointed as Minister for Forestry (or equivalent) in Western Australia, with William Bovell's 11 years and 335 days the longest time period in the position. In the table below, members of the Legislative Council are designated "MLC". All others were members of the Legislative Assembly at the time of their service. In Western Australia, serving ministers are entitled to be styled "The Honourable", and may retain the style after three years' service in the ministry.

List of assistant Ministers for Forestry

See also
 Minister for the Environment (Western Australia)

References

Forests
Ministers, Forests
Western Australia
Forestry in Australia